Crivellia is a genus of fungi in the family Pleosporaceae. It is a monotypic genus, containing the single species Crivellia papaveracea, which causes leaf blight of opium poppy. The fungus is found in Europe, Australia, India, Japan, Nepal, Pakistan, South Africa, Turkey, USA and Zambia.

"Agent Green" in Colombia 

In 2000, the government of Colombia proposed dispersing strains of Crivellia and Fusarium oxysporum, also known as Agent Green, as a biological weapon to forcibly eradicate coca and other illegal crops.  
The weaponized strains were developed by the US government, who had conditioned their approval of Plan Colombia on the use of this weapon, but ultimately withdraw that condition. In February 2001, the EU Parliament also issued a declaration specifically against the use of these biological agents in warfare.

References

External links

Pleosporaceae
Monotypic Dothideomycetes genera
Fungi of Africa
Fungi of Asia
Fungi of Australia
Fungi of Europe
Fungi of North America
Taxa described in 1863